Elli is a feminine given name, often a diminutive or a variant of names beginning with El such as Eleanor, Elena, Elizabeth, Ella, Ellen or Ellie. It is also a modern Greek version of the name Helle. Elli is also the personification of old age in Norse mythology. It is also used in use as an Icelandic masculine name of varying origins. Saint Elli was a sixth century Welsh saint who is venerated by the Roman Catholic Church.

People
Saint Elli, a sixth century Welsh saint
Elli Alexiou (1894–1986), Greek author, playwright, and journalist
Elli Barczatis (1912–1955), German executed for espionage in East Germany
Elli Björkstén (1870–1947), Swedish-Finnish gymnastics coach and theorist
Elli Burris (born 1989), American professional women's soccer player
Elli Erl (born 1979), German singer-songwriter
Elli Evangelidou (born 1968), Cypriot athlete
Elli Hatschek (1901–1944), German Resistance member
Elli Hemberg (1896–1994), Swedish abstract painter and sculptor
Elli Ingram (born 1993), English singer-songwriter
Elli Kokkinou (born 1970), Greek singer
Elli Köngäs-Maranda (1932–1982), Finnish born anthropolist and feminist folklorist
Elli Lambridi (1896–1970), Greek philosopher
Elli Leadbeater, British ecologist and evolutionary biologist
Elli Marcus (1899–1977), German born American theater photographer
Elli Medeiros (born 1956), French singer and actress
Elli Norkett (1996–2017), Welsh women's rugby player
Elli Ochowicz (born 1983), American Olympic speed skater
Elli Overton (born 1974), Australian Olympic swmmer
Elli Pappa (1920–2009), Greek writer and activist
Elli Papakonstantinou, stage director, librettist, translator and activist
Elli Parvo (1915–2010), Italian actress
Elli Pikkujämsä (born 1999), Finnish footballer
Elli Riehl (1902–1977), Austrian painter
Elli Rose (born 1986), born Eri Arakawa, Japanese actress, fashion model and DJ
Elli Saurio (1899–1966), Finnish economist
Elli Schmidt (1908–1980), German communist political activist
Elli Smula 1914–1943), German tram conductor imprisoned by the Nazis in a concentration camp, where she later died, after she was accused of subversive behavior
Elli Stai (born 1954), Greek journalist and television talk show presenter
Elli Stamatiadou (1933–2015), Greek amateur botanist
Elli Terwiel (born 1989), Canadian Olympic slalom skier
Elli Tompuri (1880–1962), Finnish actress, director, dancer, and author
Elli von Kropiwnicki, Austrian swimmer and competitor at the 1936 Olympic games

Notes

Feminine given names
Hypocorisms
Finnish feminine given names